Pterochaeta is the scientific name of two genera of organisms and may refer to:

Pterochaeta (moth), a genus of moths in the family Erebidae
Pterochaeta (plant), a genus of plants in the family Asteraceae